Olé Olé is the debut 1983 album of Spanish pop group Olé Olé for CBS Records. The album established the success of the group with 100,000 sales.

Track listing 
"Necesito más"	(Gustavo Montesano) –	3:35
"El mayor secreto" –	(Gustavo Montesano)  –	3:43
"No controles"	(Nacho Cano)	 – 4:00
"Alguien"	(Gustavo Montesano) –	3:42
"Todo mi amor no es para ti"	(Luis Carlos Esteban) –	3:32
"Conspiración (Habanera de Carmen)"	(Georges Bizet, Luis Gómez Escalar) –	3:23
"Adrenalina"	(Luis Carlos Esteban) –	2:59
"Mirando la luna por la ventana" (Gustavo Montesano)	 – 3:52
"Dame"	(Luis Gómez Escolar, Gustavo Montesano) –	3:44
"Fantasmas"	(LEsteban)	 – 4:20

References

1983 albums